The Best of Big Bang is the sixth greatest hits album by the South Korean boy band Big Bang. It was released on November 26, 2014 by YGEX.

Background
To celebrate BigBang's fifth anniversary since their debut in Japan and their Japan Dome Tour X in 2014, the quintent released another collection album which contains their best songs from their 2006 debut up to 2014.

Reception
The Best of Big Bang 2006-2014 debuted atop the Oricon's daily albums chart with 93,226 copies sold. In the weekly chart the album amounted to 120,000 copies sold and debuted at number one. This was BigBang's highest first week sales in Japan, breaking their previous record Big Bang 2 (2011), which sold 65,000 copies. Until February 2018 its sales totaled 223,690 copies sold.

Track listing

Charts

Weekly charts

Year-end charts

Release history

References

External links
Big Bang Official Site
Big Bang Japan Official Site

BigBang (South Korean band) albums
2014 greatest hits albums
Dance-pop compilation albums